Robert Mullen Company was a public relations company in Washington DC. The firm was founded in 1952 by Robert R. Mullen, who was a campaign press secretary for Dwight D. Eisenhower and information director for the Marshall Plan. A Watergate committee report revealed that the Robert Mullen Company was in at least two instances been a front for CIA operations abroad, in addition for former CIA intelligence case officer and head of the White House plumbers E. Howard Hunt.

In 1971 the Robert Mullen Company was purchased by future U.S. Senator Robert Foster Bennett, son of U.S. Senator Wallace Foster Bennett.  He closed it down in 1974.

History

Watergate
In 1972 the company received public attention in relation to the Watergate scandal when staff writer E. Howard Hunt, a former CIA intelligence case officer and Mullen employee, was revealed to have been running a group of Nixon Administration "plumbers" responsible for the break-in.  He was subsequently convicted of conspiracy and served time in prison after a check with his name on it found at the scene of the break-in connected him to one of the burglars.

CIA relationship
A report by Howard Baker, the Republican vice-chairman for the Watergate committee:

As well as for former then recently retired Agency case officer E. Howard Hunt, responsible for the break-in that touched off the Nixon Administration-toppling Watergate Scandal.

Demise
Bennett's principal client at the time of the Watergate was the CIA-aligned Summa Corporation, the holding company of billionaire Howard Hughes. In 1974, after his CIA ties and those of the Mullen Company had been revealed by the Watergate investigation, he closed the Company and joined Summa full-time as the public relations director for the parent firm and Vice President for Public Affairs for Hughes Airwest, the airline.

Notable Clients
 American Bar Association
 The Church of Jesus Christ of Latter-day Saints
 American Automobile Association
 General Foods
 United States Department of Health, Education, and Welfare
 Central Intelligence Agency

Notes

References

Public relations companies of the United States
Central Intelligence Agency front organizations
Consulting firms established in 1952
1952 establishments in Washington, D.C.